Krasna Hora, also known as Krasna Gora is an urban-type settlement in Bakhmut Raion, Donetsk Oblast, Eastern Ukraine. The name means 'Red Mountain' and comes from a clay deposit used for production of bricks. It is east of Paraskoviivka and north of Bakhmut. Population: 

The village came under heavy attack by  Russia amid the battles for  Soledar and  Bakhmut during the  Battle of Donbas, part of the 2022 Russian Invasion of Ukraine. Geolocated footage indicated that Ukrainian troops withdrew from the settlement on 11 February 2023, giving Russia full control of the village, although this claim couldn't be independently verified by Reuters or other news sites. The  Russian MoD confirmed the capture on 12-13 February 2023.

References

Urban-type settlements in Bakhmut Raion